Gila Goldstein (18 December 1947– 5 February 2017) was an Israeli actress, singer and transgender rights activist. She was one of the first activists of the Aguda, the oldest and largest LGBT organization in Israel. She is considered Israel's second transgender woman (after Rina Natan) and is one of the most prominent icons of the LGBTQIA+ movement in Israel.

Biography
Gila Goldstein was born in Turin and assigned male at birth. After immigrating to Israel, she lived in Haifa. Goldstein realized she was transgender in 1960 and changed her name to Gila. She engaged in survival sex in Haifa before having gender affirming surgery in Belgium in 1960 – the first officially documented gender affirming surgery for an Israeli. In the early 1970s, Goldstein lived in Europe and worked as a dancer and striptease performer. When she returned to Israel, she performed in nightclubs and bars, including Bar 51. She served as the prototype of one of the characters in Bar 51 directed by Amos Guttman.

Goldstein recorded several songs and performed them in "Allenby 58" club in 1990s. In 1998, together with Nino Orsiano she had a music program on the local radio.

She was awarded the Israeli LGBT community prize in 2003 and Miami LGBT Film Festival Award for the best supporting actress for her role in Good Boys in 2005. In 2010, a documentary film was made about her life. An organization that provides assistance to transgender people was named after her in 2011. In 2015, in recognition of her service to the community, she had the honor to go at the head of the Tel Aviv pride parade.

Death

Gila Goldstein died of a stroke on 5 February 2017. Her death was announced, in some places, as the death of a "male" named "Ilan Ronen", which was the name on Goldstein's ID card. Friends said Goldstein invented the name for bureaucratic reasons. In response, Goldstein's great-nephew said that no government record could change the fact that Goldstein was always a woman, and the family promised that her grave would display the name "Gila Goldstein". The funeral was attended by actors, politicians, and representatives of the LGBT community.

Filmography
 2003 "Kulan" Hebrew. 
 2005 "Good boys". Grace, mother of Manny.
 2008 "Fucking Different Tel Aviv" 
 2010 "That's Gila, That's Me". Documentary.
 2010 "Hasamba, the third generation". TV Series

See also 

 Rina Natan

References

External links
Aguda 
Interview with Gila Goldstein at TLVFest

1947 births
2017 deaths
Israeli film actresses
20th-century Israeli women singers
Jewish Israeli actresses
Jewish Israeli musicians
Israeli LGBT actors
Israeli LGBT rights activists
Israeli LGBT singers
Israeli transgender people
Transgender rights activists
Transgender actresses
Transgender singers
Transgender Jews
20th-century Israeli Jews
21st-century Israeli Jews
Burials at Yarkon Cemetery
Italian emigrants to Israel
Italian Jews
Entertainers from Turin
20th-century Israeli LGBT people
21st-century Israeli LGBT people